Xinyu railway station is a railway station located in Xinyu, Jiangxi, China, on the Shanghai–Kunming railway.

History
The station opened in 1937.

See also
Xinyu North railway station

References

Railway stations in Jiangxi
Railway stations in China opened in 1937
Xinyu